The Boca de Serpiente Formation is a geologic formation in Trinidad and Tobago. The limestones stained red with hematite, preserve fossils dating back to the Priabonian period.

See also 

 List of fossiliferous stratigraphic units in Trinidad and Tobago

References

Further reading 
 C. J. Maury. 1912. A contribution to the paleontology of Trinidad. Journal of the Academy of Natural Sciences of Philadelphia 15:1-112

Geologic formations of Trinidad and Tobago
Paleogene Trinidad and Tobago
Limestone formations
Gulf of Paria